Bailee Madison Riley (born October 15, 1999) is an American actress. She first gained acclaim for her role as May Belle Aarons in the fantasy drama film Bridge to Terabithia (2007). Madison received further recognition for her starring roles as Isabelle in the war drama film Brothers (2009), Sally Hurst in the horror film Don't Be Afraid of the Dark (2010), Maggie in the romantic comedy film Just Go with It (2011), Harper Simmons in the comedy film Parental Guidance (2012), Ida Clayton in the family film Cowgirls 'n Angels (2012), Clementine in the fantasy film Northpole (2014), Kinsey in the slasher film The Strangers: Prey at Night (2018), and Avery in the Netflix film A Week Away (2021).

On television, she appeared as Maxine Russo in the fantasy sitcom Wizards of Waverly Place (2011), young Snow White in the fantasy drama series Once Upon a Time (2012–2016), Hillary Harrison in the sitcom Trophy Wife (2013–2014), and Sophia Quinn in the drama series The Fosters (2014–2016). From 2015 to 2021, Madison starred as Grace Russell in the Hallmark Channel comedy-drama series Good Witch. In 2022, she began her role as Imogen Adams in the horror thriller series Pretty Little Liars: Original Sin, a spinoff of Pretty Little Liars.

Early life
Madison was born in Fort Lauderdale, Florida, the youngest of seven children. She has four brothers and two sisters. Her older sister, Kaitlin Vilasuso, is also an actress. Her mother is Patricia Riley. She began her career when she was two weeks old, appearing in an Office Depot commercial. Since then, she has appeared in several national commercials for major companies including Disney, SeaWorld, and Cadillac. She also serves as a national youth spokesperson for the childhood-cancer charity Alex's Lemonade Stand Foundation.

Personal life 
Since 2019, Madison has been in a relationship with Blake Richardson from the band New Hope Club.

Career

2010s

In 2010, Madison starred in her first leading role in the supernatural horror film Don't Be Afraid of the Dark. She starred alongside Katie Holmes and Guy Pearce, portraying the role of Sally Hurst, a lonely withdrawn child who is sent to live with her father and his new girlfriend. Roger Ebert of the Chicago Sun-Times gave the film 3½ stars out of 4, calling it "a very good haunted house film" and adding that it "milks our frustration deliciously."

In 2013, Madison began playing Hillary on the TV sitcom Trophy Wife, replacing Gianna LePera who played the character in the pilot. In 2014, she began playing the recurring role of Sophia Quinn in the ABC Family drama The Fosters. In 2015, she began playing Grace Russell, the daughter of Cassie Nightingale, in the Hallmark series Good Witch. Madison continued in the role until the end of the fifth season in 2019.

In 2017, it was announced that Madison would star in an adaptation of Rachel Bateman's novel Someone Else's Summer.

In 2018, Madison portrayed the role of Kinsey, a rebellious child in the slasher film The Strangers: Prey at Night. She starred alongside Christina Hendricks and Martin Henderson, as her parents. Although the film received a mixed response from critics, Madison's performance was praised and was relatively successful at the box office.

2020s
In 2021, Madison played the female lead in a teen Christian musical drama, A Week Away, alongside Kevin Quinn. Netflix released the film on March 26. The following year, she played Imogen Adams in the HBO Max horror-thriller series Pretty Little Liars: Original Sin, a spin-off of Pretty Little Liars, to critical acclaim.

Other ventures
Madison has served as the national youth spokesperson for Alex's Lemonade Stand Foundation since 2010, an organization that encourages kids to fundraise and spread awareness of pediatric cancer by running their own lemonade stands. In January 2018, Madison's first novel was published, Losing Brave, a Young-Adult Mystery which was co-written with Stefne Miller. Since November 2018, she has co-hosted the podcast Just Between Us with her sister Kaitlin Vilasuso.

Filmography

Film

Television

Music videos

Awards and nominations

Publications
 Losing Brave (January 24, 2018) (co-written with Stefne Miller)

References

External links

 
 

1999 births
Living people
21st-century American actresses
Actresses from Florida
American Christians
American child actresses
American film actresses
American television actresses
American voice actresses
Actresses from Fort Lauderdale, Florida